Hansmeyer is a surname. Notable people with the surname include:

Michael Hansmeyer, American architect
Stacy Hansmeyer (born 1978), American basketball player and coach